Sunil Bahadur (born 1976) is a male international Indian lawn bowler.

Bowls career

Commonwealth Games
Bahadur has represented India at three Commonwealth Games in the pairs at the 2010 Commonwealth Games, the singles and triples at the 2014 Commonwealth Games and in the triples and fours at the 2018 Commonwealth Games. In the men's fours the team won section B but failed to win a medal after losing to Wales in the quarter finals. In 2022, he competed in the men's pairs and the men's fours at the 2022 Commonwealth Games. In the fours event as part of the team with Navneet Singh, Chandan Kumar Singh and Dinesh Kumar he reached the final and secured a silver medal.

World Championships
He competed for India at the 2016 World Outdoor Bowls Championship in New Zealand. In 2020 he was selected for the 2020 World Outdoor Bowls Championship in Australia.

Asia Pacific
Bahadur won a triples bronze medal at the 2019 Asia Pacific Bowls Championships in the Gold Coast, Queensland.

References

Living people
Bowls players at the 2010 Commonwealth Games
Bowls players at the 2014 Commonwealth Games
Bowls players at the 2018 Commonwealth Games
Bowls players at the 2022 Commonwealth Games
Commonwealth Games silver medallists for India
Commonwealth Games medallists in lawn bowls
Indian sportspeople
1976 births
Indian bowls players
People from Ranchi
Medallists at the 2022 Commonwealth Games